"Friday the 14th" is an episode of the BBC sit-com, Only Fools and Horses. It was the third episode of series 3, and was first screened on 24 November 1983. The episode sees Del Boy, Rodney and Grandad travelling to Boycie's weekend cottage in Cornwall intending to do some illegal fishing. Once there, they are unnerved when they learn that an axe murderer has just escaped from the local psychiatric hospital. The scenario unfolds with their uncertainty of the night ahead and the goings on outside of their residence.

Synopsis
In another one of his get-rich-quick schemes, Del Boy has struck a deal with Boycie and a fish restaurant owner which will involve himself, Rodney, and Grandad staying at Boycie's weekend cottage in Cornwall and bribing the local gamekeeper to allow them to poach salmon, with the restaurant owner offering £10 for each salmon caught. Rodney is sceptical at first but is bribed by the payment.

They arrive in Cornwall during a heavy thunderstorm and are stopped by a policeman, who informs them that the storm has brought the power lines down, causing a power outage in the area. He also warns them that a convicted axe-murderer has taken advantage of the power cut and escaped from a local psychiatric hospital, where he was imprisoned for having killed a group of fishermen exactly ten years earlier.

Shaken but undeterred by the story, Del forces them to continue onwards to the cottage. Rodney becomes paranoid and claims to have seen a movement in the trees, and finding an axe in the cupboard, but Del stops him from phoning the police. Later that night, after an argument over a game of Monopoly, Rodney opens the curtains of the front window to look outside and is confronted by a man on the other side staring through the window. Rodney is unnerved but the others are reluctant to believe him when he tells them. Eventually they are interrupted by a man calling at the door, whom they allow in when he introduces himself as Chief Robinson, the head of security from the institution, and shows them his identification documents.

Reassured by the man's insistence that the escaped patient will be far from the cottage, Del feels confident to use the outside toilet. When leaving the toilet, he opens the door and accidentally knocks out the man whom Rodney had seen at the window earlier.

Assuming this man is the escaped patient, Del alerts Rodney and Grandad, who tie up and take the unconscious man to the local police station, leaving Del and the head of security at the cottage. The police quickly identify the man not as the escaped murderer, but as the local gamekeeper. The police also reveal that the real chief of security is in hospital. The escaped patient had attacked him, knocked him unconscious and stolen his uniform and ID documents, meaning Del is alone in the cottage with the real axe-murderer.

Back at the cottage, Del receives a phone call from Rodney informing him of the truth, leaving a frightened Del to experience the manic side of the murderer alone. The murderer reveals that he hates people who kill fish and inquires about the fishing rods, but Del lies to him. The situation is defused however when the murderer proposes that he and Del play a game of snooker together, albeit an imaginary one with no cues or table and insisting that he hates to win in competitive games, giving Del a chance to bide his time until the police arrive. Del seizes on the murderer's aversion to winning by proposing they play for money, and the episode ends with the pair beginning their game.

Episode cast

Notes 

 The episode title is a pun of the folk-lore bad day of 'Friday the 13th', the horror essence of the episode is a spoof of the horror film series Friday the 13th.

References

External links

1983 British television episodes
Cornwall in fiction
Only Fools and Horses (series 3) episodes